CenturyLink of Minnesota, Inc. is a telephone operating company providing local telephone services in Minnesota.

Sprint Corporation, in 2005, acquired Nextel and changed its name to Sprint Nextel Corporation. The company intended to spin off its wireline assets into a separate company, which in 2006 occurred as Embarq Corporation. The company was renamed Embarq Minnesota, Inc.

Embarq was acquired by CenturyTel in 2009, which in 2010 changed its name to CenturyLink. Embarq Minnesota, at that point, began carrying on business under the CenturyLink name. The company's legal name was changed in 2022 to reflect its ownership by CenturyLink after most of Embarq was spun off to Brightspeed.

Lumen Technologies
Sprint Corporation
Telecommunications companies of the United States
Telecommunications companies established in 1968
Companies disestablished in 2009
1968 establishments in Minnesota
2009 disestablishments in Minnesota